Faram may refer to:
 Farim, Iran, a settlement in Mazandaran Province, Iran
 Faram, Pakistan, a village in Punjab, Pakistan

See also